Thomas Anthony Doherty (born 21 April 1995) is a Scottish actor and singer from Edinburgh, known  for his roles as Sean Matthews on the Disney Channel musical series The Lodge, Harry Hook in the Descendants film franchise, Max Wolfe in the HBO Max reboot of Gossip Girl, and Walter De Ville in the film The Invitation. In 2022, he entered the world of audio, portraying Horatio Godkin in the limited series The Inventor's Apprentice.

Early life
Doherty was born in Edinburgh on 21 April 1995, and grew up in the city. He has an older brother and younger sister, and his parents were both in the banking business. He attended Royal High School in Edinburgh. 

After high school, Doherty entered The MGA Academy of Performing Arts in Edinburgh, where he studied musical theatre. He graduated in July 2015 and signed a contract with Olivia Bell Management in London.

Career
After his 2015 graduation, Doherty waited tables in Edinburgh at Tigerlilly restaurant. On his days off, Doherty split his time between auditioning for Disney Channel's The Lodge and working with the Edinburgh Fringe. He was offered the role of Sean Matthews in The Lodge, and had to undergo intensive training in mountain biking to prepare for the role. The Lodge was filmed in Belfast, Northern Ireland. He stated that he was able to play the character as a Scot, but he toned down his accent in order to better accommodate the viewers in all 108 countries that The Lodge aired in. In December 2016, The Lodge was renewed for a second series which began production in February 2017.

In 2016, Doherty auditioned for Descendants 2 and was cast as Harry Hook, the son of villain Captain James Hook from Peter Pan. Descendants 2 was filmed in Vancouver, Canada, in 2016 and aired on Disney Channel on 21 July 2017. He reprised his role as Harry Hook in the third installment of the Disney Channel franchise, Descendants 3 which premiered in 2019. In August 2017, Doherty was named one of the 50 fittest boys in the world by Vogue magazine. 

From 2019 to 2020, he appeared in the CW series Legacies as Sebastian.

In 2021, Doherty began starring in the HBO Max teen drama Gossip Girl. The following year, he starred alongside Nathalie Emmanuel in the supernatural horror film The Invitation.

On 16 September 2022, audio erotica app Quinn announced Doherty would be acting in its first audio romance series, The Inventor's Apprentice. Following the time traveling adventures of Horatio Godkin and Arabella Bellamy in the Victorian era, the three-part series debuted between 22–29 September 2022 on the Quinn app. The series was penned by Emily C. A. Snyder, directed by Rob Valentine, with sound effects by Ross Burman.  It was the first Quinn Original series, produced by WTC and Quinn Inc.  The series garnered praise particularly for its presentation of the feminine gaze in the world of audio romance and erotica.

Personal life
From 2017 to 2020, Doherty was in a relationship with his Descendents 2 co-star Dove Cameron.

Doherty credits his experience in Gossip Girl as "educational" as it "challenged [his] own preconceived notions and indoctrination of 'this is who you love, this is what you do, everything else is wrong.'" In an interview with Variety, Doherty declared that, while he has only been in heterosexual relationships, he has always seen sexuality as a spectrum and does not believe in labels.

Filmography

Film

Television

Audio

References

External links

 

1995 births
21st-century Scottish male actors
Living people
Male actors from Edinburgh
People educated at the Royal High School, Edinburgh
Scottish male film actors
Scottish male television actors